Mykkänen is a Finnish surname.

Geographical distribution
As of 2014, 94.1% of all known bearers of the surname Mykkänen were residents of Finland (frequency 1:3,412), 3.6% of Sweden (1:158,819) and 2.0% of Estonia (1:37,762).

In Finland, the frequency of the surname was higher than national average (1:3,412) in the following regions:
 1. Northern Savonia (1:590)
 2. South Karelia (1:2,381)
 3. Central Finland (1:2,705)
 4. Kymenlaakso (1:3,225)

People
 Jouni Mykkänen (born 1939), Finnish journalist and politician
 John Mykkanen (born 1966), American Olympic swimmer
 Kirsi Mykkänen (born 1978), Finnish sprinter
 Kai Mykkänen  (born 1979), Finnish politician

References

Finnish-language surnames
Surnames of Finnish origin